Kroft is a surname. Notable people with the surname include:

 Richard Kroft, Canadian lawyer, businessman and Senator
 Steve Kroft, American journalist
 Tyler Kroft, American football player

See also
 Lana Coc-Kroft, New Zealand television and radio personality
 Wim van der Kroft, Dutch canoeist